Riley Township is a civil township of Clinton County in the U.S. state of Michigan. The population was 2,024 at the 2010 census.

Geography

Riley Township is located southwest of the center of Clinton County.

Demographics
As of the census of 2000, there were 1,767 people, 611 households, and 507 families residing in the township. There were 625 housing units at an average density of 17.5 per square mile (6.8/km). The racial makeup of the township was 96.26% White, 0.28% Native American, 0.11% Asian, 0.11% Pacific Islander, 0.74% from other races, and 2.49% from two or more races. Hispanic or Latino of any race were 1.87% of the population.

There were 611 households, out of which 40.4% had children under the age of 18 living with them, 74.6% were married couples living together, 4.6% had a female householder with no husband present, and 17.0% were non-families. 12.1% of all households were made up of individuals, and 4.3% had someone living alone who was 65 years of age or older.  The average household size was 2.87 and the average family size was 3.13.

In the township the population was spread out, with 29.0% under the age of 18, 6.6% from 18 to 24, 30.1% from 25 to 44, 25.6% from 45 to 64, and 8.8% who were 65 years of age or older.  The median age was 37 years. For every 100 females, there were 101.9 males.  For every 100 females age 18 and over, there were 105.1 males.

The median income for a household in the township was $61,375, and the median income for a family was $64,154. Males had a median income of $45,577 versus $31,852 for females. The per capita income for the township was $21,682.  About 1.8% of families and 3.7% of the population were below the poverty line, including 5.1% of those under age 18 and 6.7% of those age 65 or over.

References

External links
Riley Township official website

Townships in Michigan
Townships in Clinton County, Michigan
Lansing–East Lansing metropolitan area
Populated places established in 1836
1836 establishments in Michigan Territory